A Man's Man may refer to:
 A Man's Man (1918 film)
 A Man's Man (1929 film)